José Oriol Anaya Oropeza (born 23 March 1948 in Coris) is a Peruvian politician. He was a former Congressman representing Ancash for the 2006–2011 period, and belongs to the Union for Peru party.

References

External links
 Official site

1948 births
Living people
People from Aija Province
People from Ancash Region
Union for Peru politicians
Members of the Congress of the Republic of Peru